Tanéné may refer to:

Tanéné, Boké, Guinea
Tanéné, Dubréka, Guinea